Mufakose is  the totem of the [Zumba] Shona people of central Zimbabwe who settled in the Mazoe valley in the early nineteenth century.
Three brothers of Mhofu totem Shayachimwe Mukombami, Nyakudya Chiweshe and Gutsa left their ancestral lands under Nyashanu in Buhera after domestic issues. After settling down in the Harare-Mazoe area.

Hwata name was adopted as a nickname as he had long legs and walked like a Hwata bird (Secretary bird).

Mufakose praise name was adopted after Hwata lost two separate battles and lost many fighters.

All male descendants of Hwata dynasty are called Mhofu, Hwata, Mufakose and female descendants are called Shava.

A suburb in Harare, Zimbabwe, called Mufakose, is named after the Hwata dynasty. It is also known as "Mufombi".

Mufakose is also the name of a constituency of the Parliament of Zimbabwe, that encompasses the suburb of that name. The modern Hwata people from Guruve are now living in diaspora. The Mundowa family (2011) and many others can trace their lineage to Hwata Shayachimwe Mukombamwi. The Chiripanyanga clan, whose families include the Marufu family, Chikuya, Muringai and Dzengeza families are split between Guruve and Chiweshe and trace their lineage to Bungu, son of Shayachimwe. Muringayi/Muringai clan is also found in Mhondoro under chief Nyamweda (shava mufakose)

See also
Hwata (Senatorial constituency)

Shona
Suburbs of Harare